Malik Deenar Nursing College is a nursing school in Kasaragod, India.

History
The college was established in 2002 and got affiliation with Kannur University. It is now is affiliated to Kerala University of Health Sciences, Thrissur.

Courses offered
 B.Sc. in Nursing : 50 seats 
 General Nursing & Midwifery ( GNM )

References

Colleges affiliated to Kannur University
Colleges in Kasaragod district